Jean-Didier Wolfromm (21 May 1941 – 26 January 1994) was a 20th-century French novelist and literary critic.

Biography 
A former student at the École nationale supérieure des arts décoratifs, Wolfromm worked as a critic for Le Magazine Littéraire, France-Soir and L'Express. He collaborated in particular with the France Inter radio program, . His judgments were often caustic, even scathing. He had become a figure of the Parisian literary milieu. His work - especially his novel Diane Lanster - was the reflection of his existence, that of a man not much spoiled by nature (handicap plus chronic illness), for whom seduction was nothing obvious.

Works 
 1978: Diane Lanster, Éditions Grasset, prix Interallié.
 1989: La Leçon inaugurale, Grasset, prix Maurice Genevoix

External links 
 Jean-Didier Wolfromm on Babelio
 Jean Didier WOLFROMM on Radioscopie (12 October 1978)
 La mort de Jean-Didier Wolfromm on Les Échos (27 January 1994)
 Diane Lanster, par Jean-Didier Wolfromm on L'Express (21 January 1999)
 List of critics by J-D Wolfromm on L'Express
 "Diane Lanster" de Jean-Didier Wolfromm : un roman d’amour noir, un roman d’amour fou… on Laisse parler les filles
 Mort de Jean-Didier Wolfromm Un passionné sourcilleux on L'Humanité (27 January 1994)

20th-century French non-fiction writers
French literary critics
Prix Interallié winners
1941 births
Writers from Paris
1994 deaths